Jane Herbert Wilkinson Long (July 23, 1798 – December 30, 1880) was a Texas pioneer. She owned boarding houses and a plantation in Texas. She is best known as the "Mother of Texas."

Biography

Early life
Jane Herbert Wilkinson Long was born on July 23, 1798 in Charles County, Maryland. She was a niece of General James Wilkinson; her father was James' eldest brother, William Mackall Wilkinson (c.1751-1799).

About 1811, her family moved from Maryland to the small town of Washington, Mississippi, the capital of the Mississippi Territory.

Adult life
She moved to Texas with her husband in the 1820s. In 1822, her husband died after being captured by Spanish/Mexican forces and she became a widow. Stephen F. Austin gave Jane grants of land in Fort Bend and Waller counties; but instead of farming, she opened a boarding house in San Felipe, Texas.

She sold part of her land in Fort Bend County, on which the town of Richmond was built. She later moved to Richmond, where she opened a boarding house and started a plantation nearby.

Personal life
She was married to James Long, a doctor and a native of Virginia, in Natchez, Mississippi. On December 21, 1821, at Bolivar Point near present-day Galveston, Jane gave birth to her third child, Mary James Long. She gave birth with her only slave, Kian, helping. Together the two fought starvation for weeks, hunting their own game, fishing and gathering oysters, until in early 1822, they headed out. It is often claimed that Mary was the first child born to an English-speaking woman in Texas, even though census records from 1807 to 1826 list several children born to Anglo-American mothers in Texas before 1821.

Because of this, she became known as the "Mother of Texas." Sam Houston, in a gubernatorial speech, later gave this title to Margaret Theresa Wright for Wright's heroic support of Texas troops during the Texas Revolution.

Her sister, Barbara Mackall Wilkinson, married Alexander Calvit, a sugar planter.

Death
She died on December 30, 1880, in Fort Bend County, Texas.

Legacy
A number of schools within Texas have been named after the "Mother of Texas."  Among them are the following: 
Jane Long Elementary School located in Freeport in the Brazosport Independent School District
Jane Long Elementary School located in Richmond, in the Lamar Consolidated Independent School District
Jane Long Intermediate School located in Bryan, in the Bryan Independent School District
Jane Long Middle School located in Houston in the Houston Independent School District
Long Early Learning Center located in Abilene, in the Abilene Independent School District
A marker in Fort Bend County, Texas was erected in her honor in 1936.
Jane W Long Elementary located in Harlingen, in the Harlingen Consolidated Independent School District
Jane Long Elementary School located in Midland, Texas in the Midland Independent School District

References

External links
 Jane Long historic materials from the Fort Bend Museum, hosted by the Portal to Texas History
 
 Jane Long and Kian (audio)

1798 births
1880 deaths
People from Charles County, Maryland
People from Richmond, Texas
People of Mexican Texas
People from Houston
Old Three Hundred
People from Washington, Mississippi